Tyshawn Sorey (born July 8, 1980) is an American composer, multi-instrumentalist, and professor of contemporary music.

Sorey has received accolades for performances, recordings, and compositions ranging from improvised solo percussion to opera, with work in best-of lists for both classical and jazz music. The New Yorker included Sorey in their annual "Notable Performances and Recordings" lists for 2017, 2018, 2019, and 2020; the pandemic-era entry was for premieres "cast in unconventional concerto form". His prolific output during a time of heavy restrictions on live performance led a New York Times critic to call him 2020's "composer of the year".

Sorey was named a MacArthur Fellow in 2017, a United States Artists Fellow in 2018, and in 2019 his song cycle for Josephine Baker, Perle Noire: Meditations for Josephine, was performed on the steps of the Metropolitan Museum of Art. His life and work have been the subject of features in publications including The New York Times, The New Yorker, The Wall Street Journal, NPR Music, and The Brooklyn Rail.

Sorey has recorded or performed with Wadada Leo Smith, Steve Coleman, Anthony Braxton, John Zorn, Steve Lehman, Joey Baron, Muhal Richard Abrams, Pete Robbins, Cory Smythe, Kris Davis, Vijay Iyer, Myra Melford, Dave Douglas, Butch Morris, and Sylvie Courvoisier.

In 2020, Sorey joined the faculty at the University of Pennsylvania as Presidential Assistant Professor of Music.

Early life and career

Sorey grew up in Newark, New Jersey, and attended Newark Arts High School. As a teenager, he participated in the New Jersey Performing Arts Center Jazz for Teens program, through which he was awarded a Star-Ledger Scholarship.

In 2004, Sorey completed a B.Music in jazz studies and performance at William Paterson University, where he began as a classical trombone major before transferring to jazz drumming.

After a number of years recording and performing as a sideperson for artists including Vijay Iyer and Steve Lehman, Sorey's first album as leader was released on Firehouse 12 Records in 2007. The 2-CD That/Not features various configurations of Sorey, trombonist Ben Gerstein, pianist Cory Smythe, and bassist Thomas Morgan performing an extensive array of works, from "Seven Pieces for Trombone Quartet" to the forty-three minute "Permutations for Solo Piano." Sorey primarily plays drums, but also makes appearances on piano, including on the album's opening track. The material recorded for the album exceeded even the constraints of a two-disc set: a subsequent digital release of That/Not includes five additional pieces from the same sessions, including two "4 Hands" piano tracks.

Sorey released his second album, Koan, in June 2009. Featuring Todd Neufeld (on electric and acoustic guitar) and Thomas Morgan (on bass and acoustic guitar), the 482 Music release was reviewed favorably by All About Jazz and the BBC, included in the 2009 Village Voice Jazz Critics’ Poll, and praised in NPR's "Take Five's Top 10 Jazz Records Of 2009".

In the fall of 2009, Sorey enrolled in a master’s program at Wesleyan University to study composition with Anthony Braxton. He completed his M.A. in the spring of 2011 before beginning a doctoral program at Columbia University in the fall. His enrollment at Columbia coincided with the release of his highly-lauded Oblique – I.

During the six years of doctoral study that followed, Sorey worked closely with George E. Lewis and Fred Lerdahl; off-campus, he recorded three albums with pianist Cory Smythe and bassist Chris Tordini. The first of these, Alloy, was released on Pi Recordings in 2014. For The Inner Spectrum of Variables, the trio was joined by three string performers: violinist Fung Chern Hwei, violist Kyle Armbrust, and cellist Rubin Kodheli. The Chicago Reader called The Inner Spectrum of Variables "one of the year's most arresting and ambitious recordings", and The Nation included the album in their "Ten Best Albums of 2016"; Nextbop's Rob Shepherd named it the best jazz album of the decade. The following year, Sorey returned to the trio format for Verisimilitude, which was listed third in both the 2017 NPR Music Jazz Critics Poll and The New York Times Best Jazz Albums of 2017.

In 2017, Sorey also completed his Doctor of Musical Arts in composition at Columbia. His dissertation comprises scores for his song cycle Perle Noire: Meditations for Josephine and an essay on the aesthetic practices and critical reception of the composition, its subject Josephine Baker, and the composer himself. Sorey cited Julia Bullock and members of the International Contemporary Ensemble as integral to his endeavor to "challenge the improvisation/composition binary and celebrate collaborative modeling"; in 2019, these artists joined Sorey in performing the piece on the steps of the Metropolitan Museum of Art.

After receiving his DMA, Sorey began his appointment as Assistant Professor of Music at Wesleyan University, where he established the university's Ensemble for New Music and taught courses on composition and improvised music. In the fall of 2017, he was awarded a MacArthur Fellowship for his work in music performance and composition.

In 2018, Sorey premiered Cycles of My Being commissioned by Opera Philadelphia, Lyric Opera of Chicago, and Carnegie Hall starring Lawrence Brownlee with poetry by Terrance Hayes. This song cycle centers on what it means to be a Black man living in America today and in 2020 was made into a film with Opera Philadelphia and released on their Digital Channel. In 2018 he also released Pillars on Firehouse 12. The following year he was named Composer in Residence for the Seattle Symphony and Opera Philadelphia, and his duo album with Marilyn Crispell, The Adornment of Time, was released on Pi Recordings.

In March 2020, just before the pandemic hit the Northeastern United States in full force, Sorey self-released his sextet's Unfiltered. That fall, he joined the faculty at the University of Pennsylvania as Presidential Assistant Professor of Music.

Beginning in 2019, Sorey embarked on several musical projects with Alarm Will Sound including For George Lewis, a through-composed composition scored for sinfonietta commissioned by the ensemble, as well as several versions of autoschediasms, spontaneous compositions led by Sorey drawing on the improvisational abilities of the instrumentalists. For George Lewis was premiered in 2019 at Washington University in St Louis and released on an album with two versions of autoschediasms in 2021. While one autoschediasm came from a live performance in St Louis in 2019, the other was recorded completely remotely with musicians performing from five states during the COVID-19 pandemic. Additionally, Sorey recorded a holiday-themed autoschediasm based on Coventry Carol and Sussex Carol with Alarm Will Sound.

In 2022, Sorey’s composition Monochromatic Light (Afterlife), commissioned for the 50th anniversary of the Rothko Chapel premieres there, followed by performances at the Park Avenue Armory in New York. The piece has similar instrumentation to Morton Feldman’s 1971 composition Rothko Chapel.

Musical style

Sorey's work is broadly experimental, drawing on a wide variety of influences, practices, and traditions. He opposes the categorization of music by distinct genres, and in interviews and his doctoral thesis has critiqued notions of improvisation and composition as mutually exclusive.

Described as a musical shapeshifter, Sorey says he is invested less in "combining" genres than in movement across varying musical terrains: "For me, mobility represents not adhering to any particular musical model or institution. Unlike hybridity, mobility isn’t about fusion so much as the freedom to move between different models from moment to moment."

Awards and honors

2008: Van Lier Fellowship
2008: Jerome Foundation Residency Grant
2012: Other Minds Composer Residency
2013: JazzDanmark / Danish Arts Foundation Artist Residency
2014: Shifting Foundation Grant
2015: Doris Duke Impact Award
2015: Jerome Foundation Residency Grant
2017: MacArthur Fellowship
2018: United States Artists Fellowship
2019: Seattle Symphony Composer in Residence
2019: Opera Philadelphia Composer in Residence

Discography

As leader/composer

As co-leader/composer

As sideman and/or composer
With Alarm Will Sound
For George Lewis / Autoschediasms (2021, Cantaloupe Music)
With Samuel Blaser
Pieces of Old Sky (2009)
With David Binney
Lifted Land (2013)
With Anthony Braxton
Trillium E (2011)
With Steve Coleman
Harvesting Semblances and Affinities (2010)
The Mancy of Sound (2011)
With Armen Donelian
Leapfrog (2011)
With Alexandra Grimal
Andromeda (2012)
With Henry Grimes, Roberto Pettinato and Dave Burrell
Purity (2012)
With Vijay Iyer
Blood Sutra (Artists House, 2003)
Far From Over (ECM, 2017)
Uneasy (ECM, 2021)

With Max Johnson
Quartet (2012)
With Lauer Large
Konstanz Suite (2009)
With Ingrid Laubrock
Serpentines (2016)
With Steve Lehman
Demian as Posthuman (2005)
On Meaning (2007)
Travail, Transformation and Flow (2009)
Mise en Abîme (2014)
With Lage Lund
Terrible Animals (2019)
With Roscoe Mitchell
Duets with Tyshawn Sorey and Special Guest Hugh Ragin (Wide Hive, 2013)
Bells for the South Side (ECM, 2017)
With Hafez Modirzadeh
Facets (2021)
With Pascal Niggenkemper
Pasàpas (2008)
Urban Creatures (2010)
With Timuçin Şahin
Bafa (2009)
Inherence (2013)
With Samo Šalamon
Kei's Secret (2006)
With Som Sum Sam
Beauty Under Construction (2005)
With Angelica Sanchez Trio
Float the Edge (Clean Feed, 2017)
With Sirone and Billy Bang
Configuration (Silkheart, 2005)
With Craig Taborn 
Flaga: Book of Angels Volume 27 (Tzadik, 2016) composed by John Zorn
With John Zorn
In the Hall of Mirrors (Tzadik, 2014)
Valentine's Day (Tzadik, 2014)
Hen to Pan (Tzadik, 2015)

References 

MacArthur Fellows
American percussionists
Columbia University alumni
Wesleyan University alumni
William Paterson University alumni
Living people
1980 births
Musicians from Newark, New Jersey
Newark Arts High School alumni
African-American male classical composers
American male classical composers
21st-century American composers
Wesleyan University faculty
African-American classical composers
American classical composers
Avant-garde jazz musicians
Pi Recordings artists
Intakt Records artists
21st-century classical composers
21st-century American male musicians
Firehouse 12 Records artists
21st-century African-American musicians
20th-century African-American people